Levilinea is a bacteria genus from the family of Anaerolineaceae with one known species (Levilinea saccharolytica).

References

Chloroflexota
Bacteria genera
Monotypic bacteria genera